Bókmenntaverðlaun starfsfólks bókaverslana ('literature prize of the staff of bookshops') are a set of Icelandic literary prizes which are awarded by the Icelandic Félag starfsfólks bókaverslana (union of bookshop staff) in December every year. The prizes were first awarded in 2000, the same year as the union was founded. The awards are made in the midst of the annual Christmas rush in the Icelandic book market (known as the jólabókaflóð) and generally attract a lot of interest.

Three books are nominated in each of seven categories and the winner in each category is decorated with a special mark and so easily recognised in bookshops.

The union also awards Lóð á vogarskál íslenskra bókmennta during Iceland's book-week.

Winners

2014
Ófeigur Sigurðsson, Öræfi (besta íslenska skáldsagan)
Snorri Baldursson, Lífríki Íslands (besta handbókin/fræðibókin)
Helga Guðrún Johnson, Saga þeirra, sagan mín / Jóhanna Kristjónsdóttir, Svarthvítir dagar (besta ævisagan)
Kristín Eiríksdóttir, Kok (besta ljóðabókin)
David Walliams, Rottuborgari (besta þýdda barnabókin)
Ævar Þór Benediktsson, Þín eigin þjóðsaga (besta íslenska barnabókin)
Bryndís Björgvinsdóttir, Hafnfirðingabrandarinn (besta ungmennabókin)
Hannah Kent, Náðarstund (besta þýdda skáldsagan)

2013
Sjón, Mánasteinn - drengurinn sem aldrei var til (besta íslenska skáldsagan)
Guðbjörg Kristjánsdóttir, Íslenska teiknibókin (besta handbókin/fræðibókin)
Sigrún Pálsdóttir, Sigrún og Friðgeir - Ferðasaga (besta ævisagan)
Bjarki Karlsson, Árleysi alda (besta ljóðabókin)
David Walliams, Amma glæpon (besta þýdda barnabókin)
Vilhelm Anton Jónsson, Vísindabók Villa (besta íslenska barnabókin)
Fredrik Backman, Maður sem heitir Ove (besta þýdda skáldsagan)

2012
Eiríkur Örn Norðdahl, Illska (besta íslenska skáldsagan)
Dr. Gunni, Stuð vors lands (besta handbókin/fræðibókin)
Ingibjörg Reynisdóttir, Gísli á Uppsölum (besta ævisagan)
Megas, Megas - textar 1966-2011 (besta ljóðabókin)
Jakob Martin Strid, Ótrúleg saga um risastóra peru (besta þýdda barnabókin)
Þórdís Gísladóttir, Randalín og Mundi (besta íslenska barnabókin)
Jennifer Egan, Nútíminn er trunta (besta þýdda skáldsagan)

2011
 Jón Kalman Stefánsson, Hjarta mannsins / Steinunn Sigurðardóttir, Jójó (besta íslenska skáldsagan)
 Jónas Kristjánssson, 1001 þjóðleið (besta handbókin/fræðibókin)
 Hannes Pétursson, Jarðlag í tímanum (besta ævisagan)
 Þorsteinn frá Hamri, Allt kom það nær (besta ljóðabókin)
 Biro Val, Dæmisögur Esóps (besta þýdda barnabókin)
 Bryndís Björgvinsdóttir, Flugan sem stöðvaði stríðið (besta íslenska barnabókin)
 Jonas Jonasson, Gamlinginn sem skreið út um gluggann og hvarf (besta þýdda skáldsagan)

2010
 Bergsveinn Birgisson, Svar við bréfi Helgu (besta íslenska skáldsagan)
 Ragnar Axelsson, Veiðimenn norðursins (besta handbókin/fræðibókin)
 Guðni Th. Jóhannesson, Gunnar Thoroddsen (besta ævisagan)
 Gerður Kristný, Blóðhófnir (besta ljóðabókin)
 Annabel Karmel, Þú getur eldað (besta þýdda barnabókin)
 Þórarinn Eldjárn, Árstíðirnar (besta íslenska barnabókin)
 Sofi Oksanen, Hreinsun (besta þýdda skáldsagan)

2009
 Jón Kalman Stefánsson, Harmur englanna (besta íslenska skáldsagan)
 Helgi Björnsson, Jöklar á Íslandi (besta handbókin/fræðibókin)
 Páll Valsson, Vigdís (besta ævisagan)
 Gyrðir Elíasson, Nokkur almenn orð um kulnun sólar (besta ljóðabókin)
 Mario Ramos, Hver er sterkastur? (besta þýdda barnabókin)
 Köttur úti í mýri, ritstj. Silja Aðalsteinsdóttir (besta íslenska barnabókin)
 Carlos Ruiz Zafón, Leikur engilsins (besta þýdda skáldsagan)

2008
 Einar Kárason, Ofsi (besta íslenska skáldsagan)
 David Burnie, Dýrin (besta handbókin/fræðibókin)
 Sigmundir Ernir Rúnarsson, Magnea (besta ævisagan)
 Páll Ólafsson, Eg skal kveða um eina þig alla mína daga: ástarljóð Páls Ólafssonar (besta ljóðabókin)
 Mario Ramos, Hver er flottastur? (besta þýdda barnabókin)
 Gerður Kristný, Garðurinn (besta íslenska barnabókin)
 Markus Zusak, Bókaþjófurinn (besta þýdda skáldsagan)

2007
 Jón Kalman Stefánsson, Himnaríki og helvíti (besta íslenska skáldsagan)
 Maðurinn - leiðsögn í máli og myndum (besta fræðibókin)
 Vigdís Grímsdóttir, Bíbí (besta ævisagan)
 Kristín Svava Tómasdóttir, Blótgælur (besta ljóðabókin)
 J. K. Rowling, Harry Potter og dauðadjásnin (besta þýdda barnabókin)
 Þórarinn Eldjárn, Gælur, fælur og þvælur (besta íslenska barnabókin)
 Khaled Hosseini, Þúsund bjartar sólir (besta þýdda skáldsagan)

2006
 Bragi Ólafsson, Sendiherrann (besta íslenska skáldsagan).
 Andri Snær Magnason, Draumalandið - sjálfshjálparbók handa hræddri þjóð (besta fræðibókin).
 Halldór Guðmundsson, Skáldalíf (besta ævisagan).
 Ingunn Snædal, Guðlausir menn (besta ljóðabókin).
 Ernest Drake, Drekabókin (besta þýdda barnabókin).
 Guðrún Helgadóttir, Öðruvísi saga (besta íslenska barnabókin).
 Vikas Swarup, Viltu vinna milljarð? (besta þýdda skáldsagan).

2005
 Sjón, Argóarflísin (besta íslenska skáldsagan).
 Þórarinn Eldjárn, Hættir og mörk (besta ljóðabókin).
 Hans H. Hansen, Íslandsatlas (besta fræðibókin).
 Áslaug Jónsdóttir, Gott kvöld (besta íslenska barnabókin).
 Gerður Kristný og Thelma Ásdísardóttir, Myndin af Pabba - Saga Thelmu (besta ævisagan).
 Jorge Louis Zafrón, Skuggi vindsins (besta þýdda skáldsagan).
 Christopher Paolini, Eragon (besta þýdda barnabókin).

2004
 Bragi Ólafsson, Samkvæmisleikir (besta íslenska skáldsagan)
 Mark Haddon, Furðulegt háttalag hunds um nótt (besta þýdda skáldsagan)
 Rakel Helmsdal, Kalle Güettler, Áslaug Jónsdóttir, Nei, sagði litla skrímslið (besta íslenska barnabókin)
 Julia Donaldson, Axel Scheffler, Greppibarnið (besta þýdda barnabókin)
 Sigfús Bjartmarsson, Andræði (besta ljóðabókin)
 Halldór Guðmundsson, Halldór Laxness (besta ævisagan)
 Snævarr Guðmundsson, Íslenskur stjörnuatlas (besta fræðibókin)

2003
 Ólafur Gunnarsson, Öxin og jörðin (besta íslenska skáldsagan).
 Gyrðir Elíasson, Tvífundnaland (besta ljóðabókin).
 Sigrún Eldjárn, Týndu augun (besta íslenska barnabókin).
 Þráinn Bertelsson, Einhvers konar ég (besta ævisagan).
 Dan Brown, Da Vinci lykillinn, þýð. Ásta S. Guðbjartsdóttir (besta þýdda skáldsagan).
 Zizou Corder, Ljónadrengurinn, þýð. Guðrún Eva Mínervudóttir (besta þýdda barnabókin).

External links 
BÓKMENNTAVERÐLAUN STARFSFÓLKS BÓKAVERSLANA

Icelandic literary awards
Awards established in 2003
Fiction awards
Non-fiction literary awards